Macael is a municipality of Almería province, in the autonomous community of Andalusia, Spain. Macael is famous for the production of marble.

Demographics

Twin towns
Macael is twinned with:

  Esplugues de Llobregat, Spain
  Jarrie, France

References

External links
  Macael - Sistema de Información Multiterritorial de Andalucía
  Macael - Diputación Provincial de Almería

Municipalities in the Province of Almería